is a city located in Kōchi Prefecture, Japan.

Geography
Susaki is located in central Kōchi Prefecture, facing Tosa Bay of the Pacific Ocean to the south and bordered by mountains to the north. Most of the city area is forest. The coastline is intricate, with deep coves such as Uranouchi Bay and Susaki Bay.

Neighbouring municipalities 
Kōchi Prefecture
 Tosa
 Nakatosa
 Sakawa
 Tsuno

Climate
Susaki has a humid subtropical climate (Köppen climate classification Cfa) with hot, humid summers and cool winters. There is significant precipitation throughout the year, especially during June and July.

Demographics
Per Japanese census data, the population of Susaki in 2020 is 20,590 people. Susaki has been conducting censuses since 1920.

History 
As with all of Kōchi Prefecture, the area of Susaki was part of ancient Tosa Province.  During the Edo period, the area was part of the holdings of Tosa Domain ruled by the Yamauchi clan from their seat at Kōchi Castle. Following the Meiji restoration, the town of Susaki was established within Takaoka District, Kōchi with the creation of the modern municipalities system on October 1, 1889. It was elevated to city status on October 1, 1954.

Government
Susaki has a mayor-council form of government with a directly elected mayor and a unicameral city council of 15 members. Susaki contributes one member to the Kōchi Prefectural Assembly. In terms of national politics, the city is part of the Kōchi 1st district of the lower house of the Diet of Japan.

Economy
Agriculture and commercial fishing are mainstays of the local economy, with charcoal production and cement also major contributors.

Education
Susaki has eight public elementary schools and five public middle schools operated by the city government and one public high schools operated by the Kōchi Prefectural Department of Education. There is also one private combined middle and high school.

Transportation

Railway
 Shikoku Railway Company - Dosan Line
  -  -  -  -  -

Highways 
  Kōchi Expressway

Sister city relations
 - Castanhal, Pará, Brazil, since October 1, 1979
 - Tauranga, New Zealand, since December 19, 1997

Local attractions
Tosa Domain Battery site, National Historic Site

In popular media
Susaki's official mascot is Shinjo-kun, a Japanese river otter wearing a hot pot ramen dish for a hat. Japanese river otter is an extinct variety of otter, that was last documented in the mouth of the Shinjo River in Susaki. 

Susaki has hit the worldwide press due to an unofficial mascot, also an otter, named Chiitan. Chiitan is somewhat violent, but in a humorous way. John Oliver has an episode discussing the humor of Chiitan. In May 2019, Chiitan was banned from Twitter for inflammatory content. There is speculation that this disturbing but amusing content can help the city of Susaki, either by attracting tourists or because Japanese can donate a portion of their taxes to cities where they are not resident.

References

External links

 

Cities in Kōchi Prefecture
Port settlements in Japan
Populated coastal places in Japan
Susaki, Kōchi